Santa Maria Assunta in Cielo is a Romanesque style Roman Catholic church in Vitorchiano in the province of Viterbo, region of Lazio, Italy.

History
This church was erected in the second half of the 13th century. The later bell-tower has mullioned windows and decorative columns. The facade has a large rose window. The interior has some deteriorated frescoes depicting the Incredulity of St Thomas and the Baptism of Christ.

References

Maria
Romanesque architecture in Lazio
Gothic architecture in Lazio
13th-century Roman Catholic church buildings in Italy
Churches in the province of Viterbo